Dagny is a 1977 Norwegian-Polish historical drama film directed by . It is narrated by, among others, Lise Fjeldstad, Daniel Olbrychski, Per Oscarsson and Nils Ole Oftebro. The subject of the film is the Norwegian writer Dagny Juel (Fjeldstad), and her relationship to such men as Stanisław Przybyszewski (Olbrychski), Edvard Munch (Oftebro) and August Strindberg (Oscarsson).

Plot 
Dagny Juell was the doctors daughter who left Kongsvinger for Berlin to study music, and became famous painter Edvard Munchs mistress.

Cast
 Lise Fjeldstad - Dagny Juel-Przybyszewska
 Daniel Olbrychski - Stanisław Przybyszewski
 Per Oscarsson - August Strindberg
 Nils Ole Oftebro - Edvard Munch
 Maciej Englert - Stanisław Korab-Brzozowski
 Olgierd Łukaszewicz - Wladyslaw Emeryk
 Elzbieta Karkoszka - Marta Foerder
 Barbara Wrzesinska - Jadwiga Kasprowiczowa
 Jerzy Bińczycki - Jan Kasprowicz

External links
 
 
 Dead Madonna – Dagny Juel Przybyszewska at the Norwegian Film Institute

References 

1977 films
1977 documentary films
Norwegian drama films
Polish drama films
Films set in the 19th century
Films set in Norway
Films set in Sweden
Biographical films about writers
Biographical films about artists
Cultural depictions of Edvard Munch
Cultural depictions of August Strindberg
Cultural depictions of Norwegian women
Cultural depictions of Swedish men
Cultural depictions of writers
Films scored by Arne Nordheim